is the 11th single by Japanese girl group SKE48, released in Japan on January 30, 2013.

Members

"Choco no Dorei" 

(Center: Jurina Matsui)
 Team S: Masana Oya, Yuria Kizaki, Rie Kitahara, Nanako Suga, Akari Suda, Jurina Matsui, Rena Matsui, Kumi Yagami
 Team KII: Anna Ishida, Shiori Ogiso, Akane Takayanagi, Sawako Hata, Airi Furukawa, Manatsu Mukaida, Miki Yakata
 Team E: Kanon Kimoto

"Darkness" 

 Team S: Yuria Kizaki, Yukiko Kinoshita, Mizuki Kuwabara, Jurina Matsui, Kumi Yagami
 Team KII: Anna Ishida
 Team E: Mai Takeuchi

"Bike to Sidecar" 

 Team S: Masana Oya, Akari Suda, Shiori Takada, Aki Deguchi, Yuka Nakanishi, Kanako Hiramatsu, Rena Matsui
 Team KII: Shiori Ogiso, Akane Takayanagi, Mieko Sato, Sawako Hata, Airi Furukawa, Miki Yakata
 Team E: Madoka Umemoto

"Fuyu no Kamome" 

 Team KII: Riho Abiru, Tomoko Kato, Risako Goto, Rina Matsumoto, Reika Yamada
 Team E: Kyoka Ishohara, Mikoto Uchiyama, Ami Kobayashi, Makiko Saito, Mei Sakai, Aya Shibata, Rika Tsuzuki
 Kenkyuusei: Asana Inuzuka, Tsugumi Iwanaga, Yuna Ego, Sayaka Niidoi, Miki Hioki, Haruka Futamura, Kaori Matsumura, Honoka Mizuno, Ami Miyamae

"Oikake Shadow" 

 Team S: Rumi Kato, Momona Kito
 Team KII: Shiori Iguchi, Seira Sato
 Team E: Shiori Kanako, Yumana Takagi, Nao Furuhata, Yukari Yamashita
 Kenkyuusei: Narumi Ichino, Arisa Owaki, Mitsuki Fujimoto, Mizuho Yamada

"Sore o Seishun to Yobu Hi" 

 Team S: Mizuki Kuwabara, Shiori Takada, Kanako Hiramatsu, Kumi Yagami
 Team KII: Ririna Akaeda, Shiori Ogiso
 Team E: Kasumi Ueno, Minami Hara
 Kenkyuusei: Emiri Kobayashi

Oricon Charts

References

External links
 SKE48 Discography
 Type-A
 Limited Edition
 Regular Edition
 Type- B
 Limited Edition
 Regular Edition
 Type-C
 Limited Edition
 Regular Edition
 Theater Version

SKE48 songs
2013 songs
2013 singles
Songs with lyrics by Yasushi Akimoto
Avex Trax singles
Oricon Weekly number-one singles
Billboard Japan Hot 100 number-one singles
Japanese-language songs